Number is the leading Japanese sports magazine published on every Thursday by Bungeishunju. The official name is Sports Graphic Number. The magazine is based in Tokyo.

The first issue, released in April 1980, drew attention by the piece . Yet the magazine failed to return a profit for the next 10 years. Today however, the magazine is one of the most profitable publications of Bungeishunju. The success of the magazine also led other rival publishers to launch sports magazines, though they tend to be less successful.

References

External links
 Official website

1980 establishments in Japan
Sports magazines published in Japan
Weekly magazines published in Japan
Magazines established in 1980
Magazines published in Tokyo